Linda Edna Cardellini (born June 25, 1975) is an American actress. In television, she is known for her leading roles in the teen drama Freaks and Geeks (1999–2000), the medical drama ER (2003–09), the drama thriller Bloodline (2015–17), and the tragicomedy Dead to Me (2019–2022), the latter of which earned her a nomination for the Primetime Emmy Award for Outstanding Lead Actress in a Comedy Series. She also guest starred in the period drama Mad Men (2013–15), for which she received a Primetime Emmy Award nomination. Her voice work includes the animated series Scooby-Doo! Mystery Incorporated (2010–13), Regular Show (2012–15), Gravity Falls (2012–16), and Sanjay and Craig (2013–16).

In film, Cardellini is best known for her portrayal of Velma Dinkley in Scooby-Doo (2002) and its sequel Scooby-Doo 2: Monsters Unleashed (2004), and her supporting roles in Legally Blonde (2001), Brokeback Mountain (2005), Grandma’s Boy (2006), Kill the Irishman (2011),  Avengers: Age of Ultron (2015), The Founder (2016), Green Book, A Simple Favor (both 2018), and Avengers: Endgame (2019). She also starred in the drama Return (2011), earning an Independent Spirit Award for Best Female Lead nomination, the comedies Daddy's Home (2015) and Daddy's Home 2 (2017), the horror film The Curse of La Llorona (2019), and the Disney+ television series Hawkeye.

Early life and education
Cardellini was born in Redwood City, California, the daughter of Lorraine Cardellini (née Hernan), a homemaker, and Wayne David Cardellini, a businessman. She is the youngest of four children. Cardellini is of Italian, Irish, German, and Scottish descent. She was raised Catholic. She made her first public appearance at age 10, when she sang in a school play. Subsequently, she acted in several school productions and started attending drama lessons. She graduated from nearby Mountain View's Catholic St. Francis High School in 1993, then moved to Los Angeles to seek roles in television and film.

Cardellini was a contestant in a 1994 episode of The Price Is Right, winning a fireplace.

She attended Loyola Marymount University's College of Communication and Fine Arts, graduating in 1997 with a degree in theatre arts. In 2007, she was recognized as a "Distinguished Alumna" by the university.

Career
Cardellini received her first big break role in 1996 as Sarah on ABC's Saturday morning live-action children's series, Bone Chillers. Following this, she made guest appearances on prime-time programs including Step by Step, Clueless, 3rd Rock from the Sun, and she played Lauren on Boy Meets World, a girl that came between the show's star couple. Cardellini starred in the first season of the AMC series The Lot in 1999, and spent the summer in Europe as part of a touring production of Lancelot, a fourteenth-century Dutch tragedy.

Cardellini had her first major success when she landed one of the starring roles in the NBC series Freaks and Geeks, which debuted during the 1999–2000 season. As Lindsay Weir, an honor student in the midst of an identity crisis, Cardellini earned positive response that subsequently catapulted her to fame. Cardellini starred in the live-action adaptation of Scooby-Doo in 2002, in which she played the cartoon character Velma Dinkley. She later reprised the role of Velma in 2004's Scooby-Doo 2: Monsters Unleashed. She joined the cast of the hospital drama ER in 2003 as Samantha Taggart, a free-spirited nurse. Cardellini acted for six seasons on ER, until the series finale, "And in the End...", and with the cast won the TV Land ensemble Icon Award in 2009.

Her other film work includes roles in Dead Man on Campus, Strangeland, Good Burger, Legally Blonde, Brokeback Mountain (for which she was nominated for the ensemble Gotham and Screen Actors Guild awards), and a starring role in the Happy Madison film Grandma's Boy as Samantha. She was the voice of Ursula in the role-playing video game Gladius and played the voice of Bliss Goode on the ABC animated series The Goode Family. In 2007, Cardellini was chosen to play lovelorn Clara in the CBS miniseries Comanche Moon, a prequel to 1989's Lonesome Dove.

In 2010 and 2011, Cardellini returned to the stage with the Dr. God comedy group in Los Angeles and San Francisco, appeared in Kill the Irishman and Super, and starred in the independent film Return. She appeared with cast members and producers of Freaks and Geeks and Undeclared at the Paley Center for Media PaleyFest on March 12, 2011. From June 15, 2012, to February 15, 2016, she was the voice of Wendy on the Disney Channel show Gravity Falls.

Cardellini voice acts periodically on the podcast and live show The Thrilling Adventure Hour,  on the Sparks Nevada: Marshal on Mars segments. In 2013, she was chosen to play Sylvia Rosen, a love interest of Don Draper on Mad Men. For her performance on Mad Men, she received a nomination for the Primetime Emmy Award for Outstanding Guest Actress in a Drama Series. In 2015, she played Hawkeye's wife Laura Barton in Avengers: Age of Ultron, a role she reprised in the 2019 sequel Avengers: Endgame, which was briefly the highest-grossing film of all time. Starting in 2015, she joined Kyle Chandler on a new Netflix drama series Bloodline, from the creators of Damages. The show was cancelled in 2016, and ended after its third season. That same year, she also had a starring role as Sara Whitaker in the comedy film Daddy's Home. In 2017, she reprised her role in the sequel film Daddy's Home 2.

In August 2018, Cardellini was cast to co-star with Christina Applegate in Netflix's dark comedy series Dead to Me. It premiered on May 3, 2019. For her performance, she received critical acclaim and a nomination for the Primetime Emmy Award for Outstanding Lead Actress in a Comedy Series. That same year, she co-starred with Viggo Mortensen and Mahershala Ali in the film Green Book, which won the Academy Award for Best Picture. 

In 2019, she starred in the horror film The Curse of La Llorona. In 2020, Cardellini appeared in the biographical drama film Capone as Mae Capone, the wife of the title character.

In 2021, she reprised her role of Laura Barton in the Marvel Studios show Hawkeye, which premiered on Disney+ in November 2021.

Personal life 
Cardellini dated her Freaks and Geeks co-star Jason Segel for several years following the show's cancellation in 2000. In October 2011, she and her boyfriend Steven Rodriguez announced her pregnancy. She gave birth to their daughter in February 2012. She and Rodriguez became engaged in June 2013.

Filmography

Awards and nominations

References

External links 

 

1975 births
20th-century American actresses
21st-century American actresses
Actresses from California
American film actresses
American people of German descent
American people of Irish descent
American people of Italian descent
American people of Scottish descent
American television actresses
American video game actresses
American voice actresses
Contestants on American game shows
Living people
Loyola Marymount University alumni
People from Redwood City, California